Camp Massad of Manitoba (Maḥaneh Massad) is a Jewish and Zionist summer camp located north of Winnipeg Beach, Manitoba, in the Interlake Region near Winnipeg. It is the only Hebrew immersion camp in Western Canada.  

The camp attracts campers from Winnipeg, other parts of Canada and various cities in the United States. Camp Massad is a registered charity and an accredited member of the Manitoba Camping Association.

History
The camp was founded in 1953 by members of Habonim under the leadership of Soody Kleiman, supported by the Keren Hatarbut. Eddie Yuditsky, principal of the Winnipeg Hebrew School, served as Massad's first director and Leona Billinkoff as the first 'camp mother' (a position she would keep until 1978). The camp was officially incorporated as a branch of the Hebrew Camps Massad of Canada, Massad Gimmel, in 1962.

The Hebrew Congregation of Winnipeg Beach synagogue, founded in 1950, moved to the site of Camp Massad in 1998.

Notable alumni

 Jonas Chernick (born 1973), actor
 Gad Horowitz (born 1936), political scientist
 Allan Levine (born 1956), author
 Allan Novak, television director

See also
 Camp Massad (Montreal)

References

1953 establishments in Manitoba
Winnipeg
Jewish education in Canada
Jewish organizations based in Canada
Jewish summer camps in Canada
Jewish youth organizations
Jews and Judaism in Manitoba
Summer camps in Canada
Zionism in Canada